Phocoena is a genus of porpoises with four extant species:

References

External links

Phocoena in Mammal Species of the World

Cetacean genera
Porpoises
Taxa named by Georges Cuvier